Roscidotoga eucryphiae is a moth of the family Nepticulidae. It is found in Tasmania.

The larvae feed on Eucryphia lucida. They mine the leaves of their host plant.

External links
Australian Faunal Directory

Moths of Australia
Nepticulidae
Moths described in 2000